Nischwitz is a German surname. Notable people with the surname include:

Andreas Nischwitz (born 1957), West German pair skater
Margarete Nischwitz (1891–1979), German political activist and politician
Ron Nischwitz (born 1937), American baseball player and coach
Theo Nischwitz (1913–1994), German cinematographer and special effects expert

See also
Nischwitz Stadium, a baseball venue in Dayton, Ohio, United States

German-language surnames